This is a list of newsreaders and reporters currently employed by BBC Television and BBC Radio.

BBC News employs many presenters and correspondents who appear across television, radio and contribute to BBC Online. BBC News provides television journalism to BBC One bulletins and the rolling news channels BBC World News and the BBC News Channel in the United Kingdom. In addition, BBC News runs rolling news network BBC Radio 5 Live and the international BBC World Service. They also contribute to strands across BBC Radio 4 and bulletins on all radio networks. 

The BBC has over 200 correspondents based both in the United Kingdom and abroad. BBC appointments can be short- or long-term; for example, reporter Peter Bowes revealed on BBC News (broadcast live on 8 September 2020) that Los Angeles has been his home for 25 years.

Television news presenters

BBC One and BBC Two 
Many of the presenters below also work on other BBC News output, and some also work in other parts of the BBC. Other BBC News presenters also provide relief presentation on programmes broadcast on these channels. Not included in this list are presenters of the BBC News Channel programme BBC Newsroom Live which is simulcast on BBC Two. Also not included are presenters of BBC World News programmes that are simulcast overnight on BBC One and the 19:00 edition on BBC Four.

BBC News Channel
Many of the presenters below also work on other BBC News output, and some also work in other parts of the BBC. Other BBC News presenters also provide relief presentation on programmes broadcast on this channel. Not included in this list are the presenters of the programmes BBC Breakfast and the BBC One bulletins that are simulcast on the channel. Also not included are presenters of the BBC World News programmes that are simulcast from 22:35 to 06:00 daily, unless they're mainly seen on the News Channel.

On February 2 2023, it was confirmed that all of the dedicated presenters for the domestic BBC News Channel would lose their jobs as part of the BBC's plans to merge the channel with BBC World News. Jane Hill, Reeta Chakrabarti and Clive Myrie were retained by the BBC by moving to permanent roles on the BBC One news bulletins at 1pm, 6pm and 10pm. Joanna Gosling and Tim Wilcox opted to take voluntary redundancy over reapplying for a position on the new news channel.

BBC World News
Many of the presenters below also work on other BBC News output, and some also work in other parts of the BBC. Other BBC News presenters also provide relief presentation on programmes broadcast on this channel. Presenters who have normal shows and also Relief present have their relief shows in bold.

Radio news presenters

BBC Radio 2

BBC Radio 4

BBC Radio 5 Live

BBC World Service

Reporters

Foreign correspondents
The list below reflects correspondents' normal postings.
During major international events, such as the Libyan crisis of 2011 and the Gaza conflict of 2014, foreign correspondents may be redeployed from their normal bases to cover such stories temporarily on a rota (when they are usually branded "World Affairs Correspondents" or when in Europe "Europe Correspondents"), before returning to their normal base. This can also happen to cover holidays mainly during July and August, and over Christmas periods.

Phil Mercer

UK and Ireland correspondents
Only network correspondents are listed, but additional correspondents from national and regional news teams also report for the network.

Specialist correspondents

News correspondents

Programme correspondents

Segment presenters
BBC News employs a number of business and sports presenters to anchor sections of news programmes.

Sport

Business

Weather forecasters
BBC Weather is delivered by a team of Met Office broadcast meteorologists to deliver forecasts across its range of television and radio services. Most forecasters work across all mediums and shifts.

 Philip Avery
 Darren Bett
 Stav Danaos
 Alina Jenkins
 Chris Fawkes 
 Sarah Keith-Lucas
 Simon King
 Carol Kirkwood
 Louise Lear
 Lucy Martin
 Nick Miller
 Susan Powell
 Ben Rich
 Tomasz Schafernaker
 Matt Taylor
 Helen Willetts
 Owain Wyn Evans

Programme presenters

See also
List of former BBC newsreaders and journalists
:Category:British journalists
:Category:British television journalists

References

Television news in the United Kingdom

BBC
Newsreaders and reporters